The Sikorsky S-20 (named after its designer) or RBVZ S-XX (named after its manufacturer) was a Russian single-bay unequal span two-seat biplane designed by Igor Sikorsky in 1916. Displaying some Nieuport influence, it saw very little service during World War I.

Five S-XX aircraft were built in September 1916, with the first two powered by the 100 hp Gnome rotary engine which had powered its predecessor, the RBVZ S-XVI. However, the other three were powered with the 120 hp Le Rhone engine, with which they were allegedly faster than the French Nieuport 17.

Operational history
The S-XX saw little service because it was viewed as inferior to newer enemy aircraft, and no series production was undertaken. As such, only five aircraft were ever produced.

List of operators
 
 Imperial Russian Air Service

Specifications

References

Bibliography

 William Green and  Gordon Swanborough. The Complete Book of Fighters. Colour Library Direct, Godalming, UK: 1994. .

1910s Russian fighter aircraft
S-020
Single-engined tractor aircraft
Rotary-engined aircraft
Biplanes
Aircraft first flown in 1916